Thomas Murfyn (or Mirfyn, Merfyn, Murphin), (died 1523) was a Sheriff and Lord Mayor of London.

Biography
Thomas Murfyn was a native of Ely, Cambridgeshire, and son of George Murfyn. He was a member of the Worshipful Company of Skinners in the City of London, who served as Sheriff of London from 1511 to 1512, and as Lord Mayor of London from 1518 to 1519.
 
Mark Noble claimed that Murfyn was probably not knighted until after his election to the mayoralty. Although Murfyn is often referred to in later documents as Sir Thomas Murfyn, there appears to be no record of his knighthood. It became common practice after Thomas Muryfn's mayoralty for Lord Mayors of London to be knighted and this may be one reason why later documents refer to him as "Sir". The misunderstanding may also be due to the translation of the form of address "Dominus" (a term of courtesy used in reference to an official) as "Sir". In his will, which was made on 2 September 1523 and proved in London on 15 October 1523, Murfyn refers to himself as "Thomas Mirfyn citizein and Alderman of the citie of London". The memorial to the graves lost in the Great Fire of London at St Paul's Cathedral, which lists "Sir Thomas Miryfn", may be perpetuating this error rather than evidence of a knighthood.

Family
Thomas married firstly, Alice Marshall, by whom he had thirteen children:
 Thomas
 John
 George, who became a monk
 Thomas
 John
 Frances
 Richard
 John
 Robert
 Edward (d. 1528), a wealthy London merchant who married Alice (d. 1560), widow of John Brigandine of Southampton, and daughter of Oliver Squier of Southby, Hampshire, by whom there were no surviving children. Alice subsequently married, circa 1528, Edward North.
 Bartholomew
 Margaret, who married a Lord Mayor of London, Sir John Champneys.
 Mary, who married, by 1523, another Lord Mayor of London, Sir Andrew Judde.

He married secondly, in 1519, Elizabeth, only daughter and heiress of Sir Angel Donne. alderman of London, and Anne Hawardine, of Cheshire. By Elizabeth, he had a daughter:
 Frances (c.1520/1–c.1543), who married Thomas Cromwell's nephew, Sir Richard Cromwell by 8 March 1534.
His last wife survived him and subsequently married, in 1524, Sir Thomas Denys by whom she had a son, Sir Robert Denys. Sir Robert married Mary, daughter of William Blount, 4th Baron Mountjoy, by whom he had a son, Thomas Denys.

The arms of the Murfyns were, Or on a chevron sable a mullet argent; those of Donne,  Azure semée of cross-crosslets or, a unicorn salient argent.

Mirfyn is listed as one of the graves lost in the Great Fire of London in 1666, on a monument in the crypt of St Paul's Cathedral, together with several other Lord Mayors.

See also
 List of Sheriffs of the City of London
 List of Lord Mayors of London

Notes

References

External links

 Will of "Thomas Mirfyn citizein and Alderman of the citie of London"

Attribution

People from Ely, Cambridgeshire
15th-century English people
16th-century lord mayors of London
Sheriffs of the City of London
15th-century births
Year of birth unknown
1523 deaths
Burials at St Paul's Cathedral